Monsune is the stage name of Scott Zhang, a Canadian indie pop and synthpop musician from Toronto, Ontario. He is most noted for his 2019 single "Mountain", which was a nominee for the SOCAN Songwriting Prize in 2020.

Zhang released "Nothing in Return", his debut single as Monsune, in 2017. He followed up with the EP Tradition in 2019. Other notable work includes co-producing "Race My Mind" from Drake's sixth studio album, Certified Lover Boy.

When he launched his music career, he was a student in radio and television arts at Ryerson University.

References

21st-century Canadian male musicians
Canadian electronic musicians
Canadian indie pop musicians
Canadian musicians of Chinese descent
Musicians from Toronto
Toronto Metropolitan University alumni
Living people
Year of birth missing (living people)